The soft-furred Oldfield mouse (Thomasomys laniger) is a species of rodent in the family Cricetidae.
It is found in Colombia and Venezuela.

References

 Baillie, J. 1996.  Thomasomys laniger.   2006 IUCN Red List of Threatened Species.   Downloaded on 20 July 2007.
Musser, G. G. and M. D. Carleton. 2005. Superfamily Muroidea. pp. 894–1531 in Mammal Species of the World a Taxonomic and Geographic Reference. D. E. Wilson and D. M. Reeder eds. Johns Hopkins University Press, Baltimore.

Thomasomys
Mammals of Colombia
Mammals of Venezuela
Mammals described in 1895
Taxa named by Oldfield Thomas
Taxonomy articles created by Polbot